The 1997 Cambodian coup d'état took place in Cambodia in July to September 1997. As a result, co-premier Hun Sen ousted the other co-premier Norodom Ranariddh. At least 32 people were killed during the conflict.

Background 

After being embroiled in civil conflict for much of the 20th century, on March 16, 1992, the UN Transitional Authority in Cambodia (UNTAC), under UNSYG Special Representative Yasushi Akashi and Lt. General John Sanderson, arrived in Cambodia to begin implementation of the UN Settlement Plan, that was concluded as a result of the Paris Peace Accords of 1991. Free elections were held in 1993.

The Khmer Rouge or Party of Democratic Kampuchea (PDK), whose forces were never actually disarmed or demobilized, barred some people from participating in 1993 elections in the 10-15 percent of the country (holding six percent of the population) it then controlled. Altogether, over four million Cambodians (about 90% of eligible voters) participated in the May election.

Prince Norodom Ranariddh's royalist FUNCINPEC Party was the top vote recipient with 45.5% vote, followed by Hun Sen's Cambodian People's Party (CPP) and the Buddhist Liberal Democratic Party (of Son Sann), respectively. Despite the victory, the FUNCINPEC had to enter into coalition talks with the Cambodian People's Party, led by Hun Sen, who refused to relinquish power. After being in power since the Vietnamese invasion in 1979, Hun and the CPP had largely maintained control of the state apparatus including the Royal Cambodian Armed Forces in spite of losing the election. Hun and his deputy Norodom Chakrapong also threatened a secessionist movement and claimed there would be a return to civil conflict if they were unable to maintain power.

After talks, Prince Ranariddh and Hun Sen became First and Second Prime Ministers, respectively, in the Royal Cambodian Government.

Events 
In 1997, long tensions between the two governing parties led to violence between FUNCINPEC supporters of Prince Norodom Ranariddh and of Hun Sen, resulting in a number of casualties.

In retrospect, the following issues have been identified as the causes of the violent events: the 'dual power' accorded by the 1993 power sharing formula allowed the CPP to retain control over power structures; while officially a ruling party, the FUNCINPEC concluded an alliance – National United Front – with the opposition Sam Rainsy Party. Hun Sen alleged that Ranariddh had been planning a take-over with the help of Khmer Rouge fighters, supposedly smuggled into the capital.

On 5 July 1997, CPP troops led by General Ke Kim Yan surrounded a military garrison belonging to Nhek Bun Chhay in Kampong Speu Province. Ke Kim Yan attempted to coax Nhek Bun Chhay to disband his garrison, but failed. At the same time, military police aligned to the CPP approached the residence of another FUNCINPEC general, Chao Sambath, and demanded FUNCINPEC troops surrender their weapons. Nhek Bun Chhay responded by ordering FUNCINPEC troops to resist the advances made by the CPP's troops and military police, and heavy fighting broke out at the Taing Krassang military base and Phnom Penh International Airport, where most of FUNCINPEC troops were based.

Hun Sen quickly returned from his vacation at Vung Tau in Vietnam. The following day, Hun Sen deployed his bodyguard units to the regular forces fighting FUNCINPEC troops. FUNCINPEC troops initiated two attempts to attack CPP troops, but were quickly repulsed by Hun Sen's bodyguards and regular troops, suffering heavy casualties in the process. FUNCINPEC troops subsequently retreated from their positions and fled to O Smach in Oddar Meanchey Province. Hun Sen declared Ranariddh ousted.

After the royalist resistance was crushed in Phnom Penh, there was indeed some joint resistance by FUCINPEC-Khmer Rouge forces in the Northern provinces, where the fighting against Hun Sen's offensive lasted until September 1997. CPP forces carried out summary executions of FUNCINPEC ministers. Between 41 and 60 people were executed in custody, and a United Nations report found a large number of incinerated bodies.

Following the seizure of power by Hun Sen, Prince Ranariddh went into exile in Paris. Other FUNCINPEC leaders were forced to flee the country, following the executions. With the FUNCINPEC-aligned forces now divided, the party ceased to have military power. Ung Huot was elected as the new First Prime Minister.

Aftermath 
Thomas Hammarberg, the United Nations Special Representative on human rights in Cambodia, condemned the violence, and made it clear in his October 1997 report to the UN General Assembly: the events of July 5–6 were a "coup d'état." The Cambodian People's Party rejected the characterization of the events as a coup. The coup had a severe impact on the tourism industry in Cambodia during 1997.

The United States cut aid to Cambodia in response. ASEAN withdrew a previous invitation for Cambodia to join as a member as a result of the coup. Its accession did not take place until 1999. Amnesty International also condemned the summary executions in an open letter to Hun Sen.

The CPP stated that they were committed to free and fair elections in 1998. However, the party had now established "politico-military domination". FUNCINPEC leaders returned to Cambodia shortly before the 1998 general elections. The CPP received 41% of the vote, FUNCINPEC 32%, and the Sam Rainsy Party (SRP) 13%. Many international observers judged the elections to have been seriously flawed, claiming political violence, intimidation, and lack of media access. The CPP and FUNCINPEC formed another coalition government, with CPP as the senior partner.

The coup is seen as a major turning point in the CPP and Hun Sen's consolidation of power into de facto one-party rule by 2018.

See also 
1998 Cambodian general election
 Modern Cambodia

References

Bibliography
 
 
 

1997 in Cambodia
Hun Sen
Conflicts in 1997
1990s coups d'état and coup attempts
Political history of Cambodia
Mass murder in 1997
Massacres in Cambodia
Riots and civil disorder in Cambodia
Wars involving Cambodia